Henry Black may refer to:

 Henry Black (American football) (born 1997), American football player
 Henry Black (Maine politician) (1924–2002), American politician from Maine
 Henry Black (Quebec judge) (1798–1873), judge of the Vice-Admiralty Court and member of the Legislative Assembly of the Province of Canada
 Henry Black (rakugoka) (1858–1923), Australian-born rakugoka in Japan
 Henry Black (Representative) (1783–1841), American Congressman from Pennsylvania
 Henry Black (Saskatchewan politician) (1875–1960), former mayor of Regina, Saskatchewan
 Henry Campbell Black (1860–1927), author of Black's Law Dictionary
 Henry H. Black (1929–2012), Sergeant Major of the Marine Corps
 Henry M. Black (1827–1893), United States Army officer
 H. N. Black (Henry Nelson Black, 1854–1922), American architect
 Kairakutei Black I (Henry James Black; 1858–1923), kabuki actor

See also
 Henry the Black (disambiguation)
 Harry Black (disambiguation)
 Henry Blackall (1889–1981), Irish lawyer and judge
 Henry Blackman (disambiguation)
 Henry Blackwood (1770–1832), British vice admiral